Dávid Leško (born 4 June 1988) is a Slovak football midfielder who last played for Košice.

External links
 FK Senica official club profile
 
 Eurofotbal profile

References

1988 births
Living people
Sportspeople from Prešov
Slovak footballers
Association football midfielders
1. FC Tatran Prešov players
ŠK Futura Humenné players
MŠK Rimavská Sobota players
FK Senica players
FK Železiarne Podbrezová players
FC VSS Košice players
FC Košice (2018) players
Slovak Super Liga players
2. Liga (Slovakia) players